Ernesto Córdoba Campos  is a corregimiento in Panamá District, Panamá Province, Panama with a population of 55,784 as of 2010. It was created by Law 42 of July 10, 2009.

References

Corregimientos of Panamá Province
Panamá District